Aestuariivivens is a Gram-negative, aerobic and non-motile genus of bacteria from the family of Flavobacteriaceae with one known species (Aestuariivivens insulae). Aestuariivivens insulae has been isolated from tidal flat from the Aphae island.

References

Flavobacteria
Bacteria genera
Monotypic bacteria genera
Taxa described in 2015